Tang-e Putak (also Romanized as Tang-e Pūtak; also known as Tang-e Bāvarā) is a village in Tut-e Nadeh Rural District, in the Central District of Dana County, Kohgiluyeh and Boyer-Ahmad Province, Iran. At the 2006 census, its population was 74, in 17 families.

References 

Populated places in Dana County